Robert John Napier (born 23 September 1946) is a Northern Irish former football centre half and manager, who currently teaches soccer in San Diego, California.

Biography 
Napier was born in Lurgan. With a career as both player and coach, Napier has also been a player agent and a television and radio sports analyst.

Career

Club playing career 
Napier began his career in September 1963 playing for the Bolton Wanderers, where he played until 1967, when he was transferred to  Brighton & Hove Albion for £25,000. He played until 1972 playing more than 200 games including two seasons as ever-present. In 1972, he was transferred to Bradford City for a record-equalling £10,000. He spent six seasons at Valley Parade interspersed with spells in America at Baltimore Comets and the same team after they became San Diego Jaws, and also at Mossley. In all he played more than 100 games at City, and served as manager, and assistant coach.

Club management career 
Napier served as manager at City from February 1978 to October 1978. He was unpopular as manager of Bradford City, as the team was relegated to the now-defunct Division Four. Napier returned to the United States in 1979 to take a coaching position at Pepperdine University, and continues to coach soccer.

International career 
Napier was a Northern Ireland schoolboy international, won 11 youth caps, two under-23 caps. He won his only full international cap against West Germany in May 1966.

Honours 
 Most Valuable Player, Bolton Wanderers: 1966
 Most Valuable Player, Brighton: 1969
 Football League Division Three Runner-Up, Brighton: 1971
 Most Valuable Player, Bradford City: 1973

Managerial statistics

References

External links 
John Napier's resume on his official website

Bolton Wanderers interview with John Napier

1946 births
Living people
People from Lurgan
Association footballers from Northern Ireland
Football managers from Northern Ireland
Northern Ireland international footballers
Bolton Wanderers F.C. players
Brighton & Hove Albion F.C. players
Bradford City A.F.C. players
Baltimore Comets players
San Diego Jaws players
Bradford City A.F.C. managers
English Football League players
North American Soccer League (1968–1984) players
Association football central defenders
Mossley A.F.C. players